Wahlenbergia fluminalis, commonly known as the river bluebell, is a small herbaceous plant in the family Campanulaceae native to eastern Australia.

It blooms throughout the year producing blue flowers.

The species is found in New South Wales, Victoria, South Australia and Queensland.

References

fluminalis
Flora of New South Wales
Flora of Victoria (Australia)
Flora of South Australia
Flora of Queensland